Riverside Cemetery is a cemetery in Lewiston, Maine. The  cemetery is located on the bank of the Androscoggin River which flows through Lewiston. It is owned by the Riverside Cemetery Association.

In August 2010, the cemetery was heavily vandalized, with many headstones knocked over and some destroyed.

Notable interments
 Louis J. Brann (1876–1948), Maine Governor
 William “Rough Bill” Carrigan (1883–1969), Major League Baseball player & manager
 Oren B. Cheney (1816–1903), politician, minister, and statesman
 Louis B. Costello (1876–1959), banker and publisher
 Thomas Amory Deblois Fessenden (1826–1868), US Congressman
 William P. Frye (1830–1911), US Senator
 Alonzo Garcelon (1813–1906), Maine Governor
 George W. Leland (1834–1880), Civil War Medal of Honor recipient

References

External links
 
 

Cemeteries in Androscoggin County, Maine
Buildings and structures in Lewiston, Maine